Kelsey Campbell (born June 5, 1985 in Anchorage) of Colorado Springs, Colorado is an American Olympic Wrestler who won the 2012 at 55 kg FS and 2016 U.S. Olympic Trials at 57 kg FS and competed at the 2012 Olympics. She is an actress represented by South West Artists Group, musician, author, and owns the non-Profit Repurposed by Kelsey LLC

Career 
Kelsey started wrestling in response to a bet that she could not handle being a wrestler.

Pac-12 
Kelsey attended and was the first female to wrestler to sign to Arizona State University.

USA Wrestling 
Kelsey defeated Helen Maroulis 2 to 0 at the finals of the 2012 U.S. Olympic Trials.

Olympic 
In her opening match Campbell lost 1-0, 1-0 to eventual gold medalist Saori Yoshida and in the Repechage round 2 lost to eventual bronze medalist Yuliya Ratkevich 4-0, 1-0.

References

External links
 

1985 births
Living people
American female sport wrestlers
Wrestlers at the 2012 Summer Olympics
Olympic wrestlers of the United States
Pan American Wrestling Championships medalists
21st-century American women
20th-century American women